Dichomeris mengdana is a moth in the family Gelechiidae. It was described by Hou-Hun Li and Zhe-Min Zheng in 1997. It is found in Qinghai, China.

The wingspan is 19-19.5 mm. The forewings are greyish brown, with scattered greyish-white and black scales and with the costal margin fuscous. There are short obscure streaks, as well as an irregular blotch at the base, the middle and the end of the cell. The hindwings are grey with scattered brown scales.

References

Moths described in 1997
mengdana